Per Artur Erikson (5 March 1918 – 5 August 2000) was a Swedish singer and preacher, active within the Mission Covenant Church of Sweden. As well as Christian songs, he also sang songs where Dan Andersson's poems had been set to music. His most successful release was "Till min syster", which featured in the top 10-chart Svensktoppen for 12 weeks in 1970.

References

1918 births
2000 deaths
20th-century Swedish male singers
People from Älvkarleby Municipality